WQRK (105.5 FM) is a radio station broadcasting a classic hits music format. Licensed to Bedford, Indiana, United States, the station serves the Bloomington, Indiana area. The station is currently owned by Ad-Venture Media, Inc. and features programming from Fox News Radio. And a morning show hosted by Rick St. Nick

References

External links

Classic hits radio stations in the United States
QRK